Cologno may refer to 2 Italian municipalities in Lombardy:

Cologno al Serio, in the Province of Bergamo
Cologno Monzese, in the Province of Milan

See also
Cologna (disambiguation)
Cologne (disambiguation)